Daniel Oliveira may refer to:

 Daniel Oliveira (rally driver) (born 1985), Brazilian rally driver
 Daniel Oliveira (footballer, born 1985), Brazilian football forward
 Daniel Oliveira (footballer, born 1999), Brazilian football defensive midfielder

See also
 Daniel de Oliveira (disambiguation)